Jacob Saphir (1822–1886) was a 19th-century writer, ethnographer, researcher of Hebrew manuscripts, a traveler and emissary of the rabbis of Eastern European Jewish descent who settled in Jerusalem during his early life.

Background
Saphir was born in Ashmyany in the Russian Empire (now Belarus) and immigrated to Ottoman Palestine as a child with his family in 1832. His parents, who were from the Perushim community, settled in Safed. Within a month his father died and a year later his mother died. At the age of 12, he witnessed the attack by the Arabs of the Galilee on the Jews of Safed in the lunar month of Sivan, 1834. Due to the earthquake that occurred in Safed in 1837, he moved to Jerusalem.

In 1848, he was commissioned by the Jewish community of the latter city to travel through the southern countries to collect alms for the poor of Jerusalem. In 1854 he undertook a second tour to collect funds for the construction of the Hurva Synagogue in the Jewish Quarter, which led him in 1859 to Yemen, British India, Egypt, and Australia.

The result of this journey was his momentous ethnographic work, entitled `Even Sapir, a travel diary and vignette of Jewish life and history in Yemen. Saphir published also Iggeret Teman (Wilna, 1868, consciously titled after Rambam's letter of centuries earlier), a work on the appearance in Yemen of the pseudo-Messiah Judah ben Shalom, and which was largely responsible for ending Judah ben Shalom's career. Saphir died in Jerusalem in 1886.

Saphir was the first Jewish researcher to recognize the significance of the Cairo geniza, as well as the first to publicize the existence of the Midrash ha-Gadol, both later studied with great panache by Solomon Schechter.

Sapir also did extensive research and writings on Yanover, Israeli and Greek etrogs. He dedicated a collection of poetry to Sir Moses and Lady Montefiore.

In the years 1833–1885, Saphir helped print the book Ḥemdat Yamim (reprinted Jerusalem 1977) by the arch-poet of Yemen, R. Shalom Shabazi, and even added an introduction to it.

See also 
 Al-Ousta Codex

Jewish Encyclopedia bibliography
Fuenn, Keneset Yisrael, pp. 557–558;
idem, in Ha-Karmel, vi, Wilna, 1866;
Geiger, Abraham, in Jüd. Zeit. xi.263-270.

External links
Jewish Encyclopedia article on Jacob Saphir written by Isidore Singer & Schulim Ochser.
Publications by Jacob Saphir
Rabbi Jacob Levi Saphir & his Voyage to Australia

References

1822 births
1886 deaths
Jews in Ottoman Palestine
19th-century rabbis from the Ottoman Empire
Emigrants from the Russian Empire to the Ottoman Empire
Burials at the Jewish cemetery on the Mount of Olives
19th-century male writers
Lithuanian Jews
Jewish explorers
19th-century travelers
Jewish Yemeni history
Yemen researchers
Researchers of Yemenite Jewry
People from Ashmyany
Jewish anthropologists
Jewish Indonesian history